Iatmul refer to:
Iatmul people
Iatmul language